Kirstie van Haaften (born 21 January 1999) is a Dutch professional racing cyclist, who currently rides for UCI Women's Continental Team .

Major results
2016
 1st Stage 1 (TTT) Energiewacht Tour Juniors
2017
 9th EPZ Omloop van Borsele
2019
 6th EPZ Omloop van Borsele
 8th Dwars door de Westhoek
2021
 10th GP Eco-Struct
2022
 4th Leiedal Koerse
  Mountain classification 2022 Holland Ladies Tour

References

External links

1999 births
Living people
Dutch female cyclists
Place of birth missing (living people)
21st-century Dutch women